Scarborough was an East Indiaman launched in December 1740 that performed four trips to India and China for the British East India Company (EIC). She is most famous for giving her name to Scarborough Shoal (or Scarborough Reef), which she discovered by grounding there on 12 September 1748. She was sold for breaking up in 1753.

Repair
In May 1741 Scarborough was at Portsmouth, undergoing repairs that necessitated unloading, repairing her, and reloading her.

Scarborough was under the command of Captain George Westcott, who had already made two trips to India on her predecessor, .

Voyages

Voyage #1 (1741-42)
Captain Westcott left Portsmouth on 4 May 1741, bound for Madras and Bengal. She reached the Cape on 14 August and Vizagapatam on 15 December, before she arrived at Culpee (an anchorage towards Calcutta, on 11 January 1742. Homeward bound, she reached St Helena on 21 June. They arrived safe off of Dover on 16 September. Scarborough arrived at Portsmouth on 19 September, and the Downs on 28 September.

Voyage #2 (1744-46)
George Westcott was captain of Scarborough, and she sailed from Torbay on 28 February 1744, and Plymouth on 14 March, bound for Madras and Bengal. She reached Madeira on 27 April and the Cape on 13 August, before arriving at Madras on 11 December. Homeward bound, she passed Rogues River, a section of the Hooghly River, on 24 January 1745. Scarborough reached St Helena on 8 July and Lisbon on 17 October, and arrived at the Downs on 21 January 1746.

Voyage #3 (1748-49) - Grounding on Scarborough Shoal
Captain Philip D'Auvergne left Portsmouth on 25 January 1748, bound for Fort St David and China. Scarborough arrived at Fort St David on 8 June. Continuing on to China, she was at Malacca on 12 August.

Scarborough grounded on one of the rocks of Scarborough Shoal on 12 September. D'Auvergne first tried to lighten her by throwing her guns overboard and emptying water casks, to no avail. Pulling her with anchors and boats also proved futile. Eventually, tides and swells lifted her off.

She arrived at Whampoa on 21 September. Homeward bound, she crossed the Second Bar (about 20 miles before Whampoa) on 15 December, reached the Cape on 3 March 1749 and St Helena on 1 April, and arrived at the Downs on 20 June.

Voyage #4 (1751-1753)
Captain Philip D'Auvergne left the Downs on 1 February 1751, bound for Madras and Bengal. Scarborough reached São Tiago, Cape Verde, on 27 February and Fort St David on 7 July. She arrived at Madras on 21 July and Culpee on 6 August. Homeward bound, she was at Barrabulla (or Barra Bulla), which is a sandbank that forms near Kedgeree in the Hooghli River, on 23 February 1852. She had to stop at Mauritius on 15 June for repairs, and did not leave until 20 October. She reached St Helena on 2 December, and arrived at the Downs on 10 February 1753.

Fate
Her owners sold Scarborough in 1753 for breaking up.

Notes, citations, and references
Notes

Citations

References
 
 
 

Thomas, James H. (1999) The East India Company and the Provinces in the Eighteenth Century; Volume 1: Portsmouth and the East India Company 1700-1815 (Edwin Mellen). 
Wright, Gabriel, ed., (1804) A New Nautical Directory for the East-India and China Navigation .., (W. Gilbert).

1740 ships
Ships of the British East India Company
Age of Sail merchant ships
Merchant ships of the United Kingdom
Maritime incidents in 1748